Albert Robert William McTaggart (20 April 1916 – 11 August 1997) was an Australian rules footballer who played with Carlton and Footscray in the Victorian Football League (VFL) during the 1940s.

A centre half forward in Williamstown's 1939 VFA premiership team, McTaggart was used as a forward at Carlton to limited effect. He kicked three goals from full-forward in his second senior game, against North Melbourne at Princes Park.

McTaggart returned to Williamstown for the second half of the 1941 season and then in 1942 he crossed to Footscray where he was shifted to defence, mostly as a back pocket. He played all of Footscray's 19 games in 1944, including a Semi Final. He missed the early part of the 1945 VFL season due to a hand injury.

McTaggart finished his football career in Tasmania, coaching Clarence, although he did return to Williamstown in 1952 and coached the Seconds.

References

1916 births
Carlton Football Club players
Western Bulldogs players
Williamstown Football Club players
Clarence Football Club coaches
Australian rules footballers from Melbourne
1997 deaths
People from Williamstown, Victoria